Thushara is a 1973 Sri Lankan Sinhala romantic film directed by Yasapalitha Nanayakkara and produced by Mohamed Omar Kareem Hassan. It stars Vijaya Kumaratunga and Malini Fonseka in lead roles along with Joe Abeywickrama and Sonia Disa. Music composed by P. L. A. Somapala. The remake of the film was screened in 2009 with the same title, where Saliya Sathyajith and Shalika Edirisinghe played the lead roles of 'Sampath' and 'Thushara' respectively. 

The film became a blockbuster of that year and commercially successful. It also received critical acclaim specially for the songs: "Kalak Thisse" and "Oho Thushara". It is the 261st film in Sinhala cinema.

Plot
Sampath, Thushara and Keerthi are batchmates. Sonia is a relation of Sampath. Thushara is Sampath's girl friend at campus. Sonia and Thushara are friends. Sonia's father and Sampath's mother tries to make them marry but Sampath doesn't have any romantic feelings for Sonia. So Sonia and specially her father does things to put apart Thushara and Sampath. One is to tell fake things to Thushara's father about Sampath and make him disappointed. Another one is attacking Sampath at a club. The story goes on as Sampath persists those challenges and finally marries Thushara and at the end of the film we get the feeling that Sonia and Keerthi find love between them too.

Cast
 Vijaya Kumaratunga as Sampath
 Malini Fonseka as Thushara
 Joe Abeywickrama as Keerthi
 Baptist Fernando as Wijesinghe
 Sonia Disa as Sonia
 Mark Samaranayake as Loku Mahathaya 'Douglas'
 Shanthi Lekha as Sampath's mother
 B. S. Perera as Wilson
 Douglas Wickremasinghe as Thushara's father
 Alexander Fernando as Alex
 Lilian Edirisinghe as Villager
 Piyadasa Wijekoon as Vijay henchman

Soundtrack

References

External links
 
 Complete film

1973 films
1970s Sinhala-language films